"Electric Head Pt. 2 (The Ecstasy)" is the second official single from the Astro-Creep: 2000 album by the heavy metal band White Zombie. A remix version of this song was the first track on the 1996 album Supersexy Swingin' Sounds.

Origins
The song contains audio samples taken from the 1971 movie Shaft. In the song, the lyrics "A fistful of hair and a splinter in the mind" could possibly refer to Lucio Fulci's 1979 film Zombie in which a zombie grabs a woman by the hair and pulls her through a closet, causing a shard of wood to pierce her eye.

Music video
The music video, the second music video made for a song from the Astro Creep album, shows the band playing in a circus of freaks, clowns and monsters while riding on a truck.

Track listings

First single (1995)
 "Electric Head Pt. 2 (the Ecstasy)" (LP version) – 3:53
 "Blood, Milk and Sky" (Im-Ho-Tep 3,700 Year Old Boogie Mix) – 5:03

Second single (1995)
 "Electric Head Pt. 2 (the Ecstasy)" (The Creature Feature 56 Mix) – 4:55
 "Electric Head Pt. 2 (the Ecstasy)" (LP version) – 3:53
 "Electric Head Pt. 2 (the Ecstasy)" (Shut Up and Kill Mix) – 4:55
 "Electric Head Pt. 1 (the Agony)" (LP version) – 4:54

Third single (1995)
 "Electric Head Pt. 2 (the Ecstasy)" (LP version) – 3:53
 "More Human than Human" (The Warlord of Mars Mega Mix) – 4:57
 "Blood, Milk and Sky" (Im-Ho-Tep 3,700 Year Old Boogie Mix) – 5:03
 "Thunder Kiss '65" (Swinging Lovers Mix) – 4:44

Fourth single (1995)
 "Electric Head Pt. 2 (the Ecstasy)" (LP version) – 3:53
 "More Human than Human" (Warlord of Mars Mega Mix) – 5:00
 "Black Sunshine" (Indestructible "Sock It to Me" Psycho-Head Mix) – 5:01
 "Thunder Kiss '65" (Swinging Lovers Mix) – 6:14
 "Creature of the Wheel" (LP version) – 3:25 {incorrectly listed as "Electric Head Pt.2" (the Ecstasy (clean edit) on disc}

Fifth single (1995)
 "Electric Head Pt. 2 (The Ecstasy)" (LP version) – 3:53
 "El Phantasmo and the Chicken-Run Blast-O-Rama" (LP version) – 4:13
 "More Human than Human" (LP version) – 4:28
 "Super-Charger Heaven" (LP version) – 3:37

Sixth single (1996)
 "Electric Head Pt. 2 (The Ecstasy)" (LP version) – 3:53
 "El Phantasmo and the Chicken-Run Blast-O-Rama" (LP version) – 4:13
 "More Human than Human" (Princess of Helium Ultra Mix) – 4:17
 "Blood, Milk & Sky" (Im-Ho-Tep 3,7000 Year Old Boogie Mix) – 5:03

Seventh single (1996)
 "Electric Head Part 2 (The Ecstasy)" (LP version) – 3:35
 "El Phantasmo and the Chicken-Run Blast-O-Ram" (LP version) – 4:12
 "Super-Charger Heaven" (LP version) – 3:37
 "More Human than Human" (The Warlord of Mars Mega Mix) – 5:00

Eighth single (1996)
 "Electric Head Part 2 (The Ecstasy)" (LP version) – 3:35
 "Super-Charger Heaven" (LP version) – 3:37
 "More Human than Human" (LP version) – 4:28
 "Thunder Kiss '65" (LP version) – 3:54

Charts

References

White Zombie (band) songs
1995 singles
Songs written by Rob Zombie
Song recordings produced by Terry Date
1995 songs